Sibylla Budd (born c. 1976) is an Australian actress perhaps best known for her roles in the television series The Secret Life of Us and Winners & Losers.

Early life
Budd grew up in Canberra, attended Canberra Girls' Grammar School and graduated from the Victorian College of the Arts with a Bachelor of Dramatic Art in 2000.

Career
In 2000 Budd appeared in the Australian Broadcasting Corporation (ABC) soap opera Something in the Air playing Sharon. In 2001 she was the leading female in The Bank as Michelle Roberts, and played Sam Cooper in the TV mini-series The Farm. That year she also began playing her break-out role of Gabrielle Kovich in The Secret Life of Us.

Budd left The Secret Life of Us in late 2003 a year before the series was cancelled. In 2005 she joined the cast of medical drama series All Saints playing Dyanna Richardson whose role was Nursing Unit Manager. In 2007 Budd appeared in Channel Nine's naval drama, Sea Patrol as marine biologist Ursula Morrell and in the feature film directorial debut of Gallipoli actor Mark Lee in The Bet, starring alongside Matthew Newton, Aden Young and Australian acting veteran Roy Billing.

Budd also had a guest role in an episode of the Australian comedy series, Kath & Kim as character Sharon Strezlecki's childhood friend.

In 2008 Budd appeared in the $40million advertising campaign to sell Australia, directed by Baz Luhrmann for Tourism Australia entitled "Come Walkabout" with Matthew Le Nevez.

In 2013 Budd appeared on Seven Network's Winners & Losers in Season 3 Episode 3 as the Head of Emergency. She also had a guest-starring role in Peter Helliar's series for the Australian Broadcasting Corporation series, It's a Date.

After the 2003 season of Secret Life, Budd joined her co-star Deborah Mailman on a journey to Tanzania with World Vision. The documentary The Secret Life of Tanzania was screened on Australian television in January 2004.

In August 2006 Budd was appointed member of the Advertising Standards Bureau, an advertising industry self-regulation body concerned with standards of advertising material in print, television and radio media.

Filmography

References

External links
Aussiewood Short Bio
World Vision, The Secret Life Of Tanzania
National Film and Sound Archive
Australian Film and Television Archive

Australian film actresses
Australian television actresses
Year of birth missing (living people)
Living people
Victorian College of the Arts alumni
Place of birth missing (living people)
Actresses from Canberra